A carbine is a long arm firearm with a shortened barrel.

The word may also refer to:

 John Carbine (1855–1915), American baseball player
 Martha Vist Carbine, a character in the Japanese novel series Mobile Suit Gundam Unicorn
 Carbine (horse) (1885–1914), a champion New Zealand-bred Thoroughbred racehorse
 Carbine Studios, a videogame developer

See also
 Carbine affair, a joint German/American law enforcement operation
 Carbine Club Stakes (ATC), a race named in honor of the racehorse
 VRC Carbine Club Stakes, a second race named after the horse
 Elaine Carbines, Australian politician